Dmitry Aleksandrovich Volkov (also transliterated Dimitry; ; born 25 May 1995) is a Russian volleyball player. He is part of the Russia men's national volleyball team which competed at the 2016 Summer Olympics. On club level, he plays for Russian club Zenit Kazan.

Sporting achievements

Clubs
 CEV Challenge Cup
  2015/2016 – with Fakel Novy Urengoy
  2016/2017 – with Fakel Novy Urengoy

Youth national team
 2013  FIVB U19 World Championship
 2014  CEV U20 European Championship
 2015  FIVB U23 World Championship
 2015  FIVB U21 World Championship

National team
 2017  CEV European Championship
 2018  FIVB Nations League
 2019  FIVB Nations League
 2021  Olympic Games

Individual awards
 2013: FIVB U19 World Championship – Best Outside Spiker
 2015: FIVB U21 World Championship – Best Outside Spiker
 2017: CEV Challenge Cup – Most Valuable Player
 2017: Memorial of Hubert Jerzy Wagner – Best Outside Spiker
 2017: CEV European Championship – Best Outside Spiker
 2018: FIVB Nations League – Best Outside Spiker
 2018: Memorial of Hubert Jerzy Wagner – Best Receiver
 2018: FIVB Club World Championship – Best Outside Spiker
 2019: FIVB Nations League – Best Outside Spiker

References

External links
 Dmitry Volkov at Volleybox.net
 Dmitry Volkov at the International Volleyball Federation
 
 
 Dimitry Volkov at WorldofVolley.com
 

1995 births
Living people
People from Novokuybyshevsk
Russian men's volleyball players
European Games medalists in volleyball
European Games bronze medalists for Russia
Volleyball players at the 2015 European Games
Olympic volleyball players of Russia
Volleyball players at the 2016 Summer Olympics
Volleyball players at the 2020 Summer Olympics
Medalists at the 2020 Summer Olympics
Olympic silver medalists for the Russian Olympic Committee athletes
Olympic medalists in volleyball
VC Zenit Kazan players
Sportspeople from Samara Oblast